Plotheia decrescens is a moth of the family Nolidae first described by Francis Walker in 1857. It is found in Sri Lanka.

References

Moths of Asia
Moths described in 1857
Nolidae